Tresa may refer to the following people:
Given name
Tresa Glenn Protzman (Born 1964), Philanthropist, Producer, Writer, 1980's model and American descendant of William Wallace, Augustine Washington, Old Tassel Reyetaeh ...
Tresa Hughes (1929–2011), American stage, film and television actress
Tresa Spaulding Hamson, American basketball player

Surname
Catherine Tresa (born 1989), Indian film actress and model